The 2015 Bury Metropolitan Borough Council Election took place on 7 May 2015 to elect members of the Metropolitan Borough of Bury in England. This was on the same day as other local elections.

17 seats were contested. The Labour Party won 10 seats, the Conservatives won 6 seats, and the Liberal Democrats won 1 seat.

After the election, the total composition of the council was as follows:
Labour 35
Conservative 12
Liberal Democrats 2
Independent (politician) 2

Election result

Ward results

References

2015 English local elections
May 2015 events in the United Kingdom
2015
2010s in Greater Manchester